43 The Shambles is an historic building in the English city of York, North Yorkshire. Grade II listed, part of the structure dates to the late 18th century, with a remodelling occurring in the 20th century.

References 

43
Houses in North Yorkshire
Buildings and structures in North Yorkshire
18th-century establishments in England
Grade II listed buildings in York
Grade II listed houses
18th century in York